Quechultenango  is a city and seat of the municipality of Quechultenango, in the state of Guerrero, south-western Mexico.

References 

Populated places in Guerrero
Municipality seats in Guerrero